Cyclic AMP-responsive element-binding protein 5 is a protein that in humans is encoded by the CREB5 gene.

The product of this gene belongs to the CRE (cAMP response element)-binding protein family. Members of this family contain zinc finger and bZIP DNA-binding domains. The encoded protein specifically binds to CRE as a homodimer or a heterodimer with c-Jun or CRE-BP1, and functions as a CRE-dependent trans-activator. Alternatively spliced transcript variants encoding different isoforms have been identified.

References

External links

Further reading